André Defoort (22 July 1914 – 12 January 1972) was a Belgian racing cyclist. He won the Belgian national road race title in 1941.

References

External links

1914 births
1972 deaths
Belgian male cyclists
People from Harelbeke
Cyclists from West Flanders